Operation Prek Ta was a joint Cambodian-South Vietnamese offensive at the beginning of 1972 against Communist forces south of Route I. The result proved inconclusive, and the Khmer National Armed Forces was forced to pull back to Phnom Penh.

Sources
The war in Cambodia, 1970-75 By Kenneth Conboy, Kenneth Bowra, p. 7

Prek Ta
Prek Ta
Prek Ta
1972 in Vietnam
Battles and operations of the Vietnam War in 1972
Cambodia–Vietnam relations